Bill White (born December 6, 1959) is an American bobsledder. He competed in the four man event at the 1988 Winter Olympics.

References

External links
 

1959 births
Living people
American male bobsledders
Olympic bobsledders of the United States
Bobsledders at the 1988 Winter Olympics
Bobsledders from Chicago